Axum Airport   , also known as Emperor Yohannes IV Airport, is an airport serving Axum, a city in the northern Tigray Region of Ethiopia. The name of the city and airport may also be transliterated as Aksum.

The airport is named after Yohannes IV, the Emperor of Ethiopia from 1872 to 1889.

The airport was heavily damaged by Tigray People's Liberation Front forces during the Tigray conflict in November 2020.

Facilities
It is capable of receiving very large aircraft, such as the Antonov 124, which brought the Axum Obelisk back from Italy in 2005.

Airlines and destinations

Incidents
On 2 May 1988, Douglas C-47A ET-AGT of Ethiopian Airlines was destroyed on the ground in an attack on the airport by Ethiopian Air Force MiG-23s.

References

External links

Airports in Ethiopia
Tigray Region
Buildings and structures in Axum